The Samjhauta Express was a bi-weekly train — Thursday and Monday — that runs between Delhi and Attari in India and  Lahore in Pakistan. The word Samjhauta means "agreement", "accord" and "compromise" in both Hindi and Urdu.

Until the reopening of the Thar Express, this was the only rail connection between the two countries. The train was started on 22 July 1976 following the Simla Agreement and ran between Amritsar and Lahore, a distance of about 50.2 km. Following disturbances in Punjab in the late eighties, due to security reasons Indian Railways decided to terminate the service at Attari, where customs and immigration clearances take place. On 14 April 2000, in an agreement between Indian Railways and Pakistan Railways (PR), the distance was revised to cover just under three km.

History
An earlier train ran between Amritsar and Lahore and vice versa and carried 8,239 persons from India to Pakistan and  10,360 from Pakistan to India from 28 October 1954 to 30 November 1954.

Samjhauta Express was a daily train when the service started in 1976 and changed to a bi-weekly schedule in 1994. Earlier the rakes were returned to the home country the same day but later in 2000 the rake remained overnight at that location.

The train's first break of service was when it was discontinued on 1 January 2002 in the wake of the terrorist attack on the Indian Parliament on 13 December 2001. Service resumed on 15 January 2004. Service was also suspended following the 27 December 2007, assassination of Benazir Bhutto as a preventive measure to deny militants a "high-value target" that was of great symbolic importance to both India and Pakistan.

On 8 October 2012, police recovered about 100 kg of contraband heroin and more than 500 rounds of bullet ammunition at Wagah border on the train heading for Delhi.

On 28 February 2019, the service was suspended following the 2019 India–Pakistan standoff. A spokesman for the Pakistan Foreign Office said that service was suspended "in view of the prevailing tensions between Pakistan and India" while it was reported that India has suspended the running of the train on its side, due to "drastic decline in occupancy" and "the suspension of services from across the border".

On 8 August 2019, the service was suspended by Pakistan following the revocation of Article 370 in Jammu And Kashmir.

Route

Its termini are Lahore in Pakistan and Delhi in India. The border crossing takes place between Wagah in Pakistan and Attari in India. Originally, this was a through service with the same rake going all the way between the termini; later the Pakistani rake stopped at Attari at which point passengers had to change trains.

Now there is a train from Delhi to Attari where all passengers alight for customs and immigration. This train does not have any commercial stops between Delhi and Attari. It is incorrectly referred to as the Samjhauta Express and it is officially known as the Delhi–Attari or Attari–Delhi Express. The actual Samjhauta Express runs from Attari to Lahore, although the passengers are checked at Wagah, the first station on the Pakistani side. The train service was set up with an agreement between Indian Railways (IR) and Pakistan Railways (PR) to alternately use an Indian and a Pakistani rake and locomotive for the train, six months at a time.

The train usually has between four and eight coaches. The rake supplied by Pakistan is usually hauled by an Alco DL-543 class ALU20 diesel loco (Lahore shed), with the entire train in the standard dark green livery of PR.

Incidents

2007 bombing

In the early hours of 18 February 2007, 70 people (mostly Pakistani civilians and a few Indian military guarding the train) were killed and scores more injured in a terrorist attack on the Delhi–Attari Express. The attack occurred at Diwana station near the Indian city of Panipat, Haryana. Officials found evidence of improvised explosive devices (IEDs) made with RDX, containing fragmentation  and flammable material, including three unexploded IEDs. The National Investigation Agency suspected that the blasts were masterminded by Swami Aseemanand, which was dismissed later for lack of evidence.

On 1 July 2009, the US Department of Treasury designated Arif Qasmani of the Lashkar-e Tayyiba as a person involved in terrorism, citing among other things his involvement in the Samjhauta Express bombing.

On 30 December 2010, India's National Investigation Agency claimed that they had solid evidence that Swami Aseemanand was the mastermind behind the blasts. He had taken help from his friend  Sandeep Dange, an engineering graduate 
and has done higher study in physics, and Ramji Kalsangra, an electrician, to build the improvised explosive devices used in the blasts. On 8 January 2011, Aseemanand allegedly confessed the bombing of Samjhauta express, a statement later found to be obtained under duress. Later the Hindu nationalist group RSS (Rashtriya Swayamsevak Sangh) sent a legal notice to CBI (Central Bureau of Investigation) accusing it of deliberately leaking Swami Aseemanand's confession in the media. RSS spokesman Ram Madhav called the investigation maligning of organizations and individuals.

According to various local newspapers, NIA arrested Kamal Chauhan, who is deemed by the NIA as the main operative, in February 2012.

References

External links

Transport in Lahore
Transport in Delhi
Named passenger trains of Pakistan
International named passenger trains
Named passenger trains of India
Transport in Amritsar
India–Pakistan relations
Indira Gandhi administration
Government of Zulfikar Ali Bhutto
Railway services introduced in 1976
2007 Samjhauta Express bombings